Albertina Carlos Pondja (born 23 May 1993), known as Goia, is a Mozambican footballer who plays as a midfielder for CD Costa do Sol and the Mozambique women's national team.

Club career
Goia has played for Costa do Sol in Mozambique.

International career
Goia capped for Mozambique at senior level during the 2021 COSAFA Women's Championship.

References

External links

1993 births
Living people
Sportspeople from Maputo
Mozambican women's footballers
Women's association football midfielders
CD Costa do Sol players
Mozambique women's international footballers